The Judería de Córdoba,   ‘the Jewish Quarter of Córdoba’, is   the area of the Spanish city of Córdoba in which the Jews lived between the 10th and 15th centuries.

It is one of the most visited areas by tourists given that, besides the Mosque, you can see monuments such as the Sinagoga (Synagogue), the Zoco Municipal (Zoco Municipal Market) or the Museo Taurino (Bull-fighting Museum), among others. It is part of the historic centre of Córdoba which was named a World Heritage Site by UNESCO in 1994.

Calle de la judería de Córdoba (Jewish Quarter of Córdoba Street) 
Córdoba went through a period when three peoples (Christian, Jewish and Muslim) and their respective religions lived together, albeit, the non-Muslim population living subjugated under Islamic Law with Jews having their own court system. Walking through the Jewish Quarter, along the Calle de los Judíos (Jewish Street), visitors can now find a magnificent bronze statue dedicated to Maimónides, the great Jewish philosopher and doctor from Córdoba.

During this period, the majority of the Jewish people lived under the rule of Islam. During the four years of Umayyad hegemony, cultural, artistic and commercial Muslim activities turned Al-Ándalus (Muslim Spain) into the most cultured country in Europe. Historians talk of Córdoba with admiration, the capital of the Umayyad Caliphate, which turned into a magnificent cultural centre with its lakes and parks, amazing palaces and mosques. The court attracted and exercised its patronage over poets and philosophers, men of literature and science.

During the 10th century, Córdoba was the largest economic and cultural centre of the Western world.

In 756 AD, the Umayyad Abd-al-Rahman I, turned Córdoba into the capital of Muslim Spain and during the following 250 years it turned into one of the largest commercial and intellectual centres in the world. In 929 AD, Abd-al-Rahman III, proclaimed the caliphate and the city reached its highest splendour, rivalling Damascus and Baghdad, centres of great economic and intellectual prosperity. From the 11th century, due to the disintegration of Muslim power in Spain, part of the cultural success of Córdoba was lost, although it remained a centre for people of literature and scholars. In the 12th century, the actions of philosophers Averroes and Maimónides stand out. In 1236, Fernando III el Santo (The Saint) took the city and integrated it into the Kingdom of Castile.

See also 
 Historic Centre of Córdoba 
 Córdoba Synagogue

References 

Córdoba, Spain
Neighbourhoods in Spain